Sušany is a village in the Poltár District of Slovakia. The village lies in the southern part of the historic area of Malohont, in the valley of the small river Suchá.

History
The first written notice about the village is from 1407, where it is mentioned as a property of Mikofalvy family. The art of pottery along with agriculture have been the main source of income for local people since the first settlements in the Bronze Age. However, in 1950s the last pottery kiln, called bana, was closed. Considerable part of extant products is kept in the pottery collection in Sušany, placed in the municipal office.

Sightseeings
The dominating feature of the village is classicist Roman Catholic Saint Anne Church, built in 1911. In the centre there is a municipal park with a World War II memorial. Another feature of the area is the well-preserved popular architecture represented by peasant houses from the beginning of 19th century.

References

External links
 
 

Populated places in Slovakia